St. William's Catholic Church is a historic Roman Catholic church on Long Point on Raquette Lake in Raquette Lake, Hamilton County, New York.

Description
St. William's was designed by prominent New York architect J. Cleaveland Cady's firm at the height of Shingle Style architecture fashion. It was built by William West Durant in 1890 and is a rectangular, one-story church with a steeply pitched roof. The main facade features a two-story cylindrical tower capped by a conical roof and flanked by a pair of open porches.

Since 1993, the building has served as a location for community events.

It was added to the National Register of Historic Places in 2005.

References

External links
 
 St. Williams on Long Point

Roman Catholic churches in New York (state)
Churches on the National Register of Historic Places in New York (state)
1890s architecture in the United States
Shingle Style church buildings
Churches in Hamilton County, New York
National Register of Historic Places in Hamilton County, New York
Roman Catholic parishes in the Diocese of Ogdensburg
Shingle Style architecture in New York (state)